Leonard A. Leo (born 1965) is an American lawyer and conservative legal activist. He was the longtime vice president of the Federalist Society and is currently, along with Steven G. Calabresi, the co-chairman of the organization's board of directors.

Leo has been instrumental in building a network of influential conservative groups funded mostly by anonymous donors, including The 85 Fund and Concord Fund which serve as funding hubs for nonprofits in the network. He assisted Clarence Thomas in his Supreme Court confirmation hearings and led campaigns to support the nominations of John Roberts, Samuel Alito, Neil Gorsuch, Brett Kavanaugh, and Amy Coney Barrett.

Early life and education 
Leo was born on Long Island, New York, in 1965, and raised in suburban New Jersey to a family of practicing Catholics. His grandfather, an Italian immigrant, was a vice-president of Brooks Brothers. Leo attended Cornell University, graduating with a bachelor's degree in 1986, and working as an intern in the office of Senator Orrin Hatch. Leo completed a J.D. degree at Cornell Law School in 1989, then clerked for federal judge A. Raymond Randolph of the United States Court of Appeals for the District of Columbia Circuit.

Career

Judicial nomination work 
While studying law at Cornell, Leo founded a student chapter of the Federalist Society in 1989, and subsequently went to work for the Society in 1991 in Washington, D.C. He met Clarence Thomas while clerking in the Appeals Court, and the two became close friends. Leo delayed his start at the Federalist Society to assist Thomas in his Supreme Court confirmation hearings. Leo served at the Federalist Society in various capacities for more than 25 years. In 2019, The Washington Post reported that the Federalist Society had paid Leo an annual salary of more than $400,000 for a number of years.

Leo took leaves of absence from the Federalist Society to organize efforts in support of the confirmations of John Roberts and Samuel Alito to the U.S. Supreme Court. Leo helped to push the Bush administration's nomination of Miguel Estrada to the judiciary.

In 2003, when George W. Bush intended to criticize the practice of affirmative action in a speech but praise racial diversity, Leo called White House officials to complain; he said that the praise for racial diversity would "disgust any conservative who thinks that this is a matter of principle." Leo told The Washington Post, he "was conveying the widely shared belief among conservatives that discriminating on the basis of race is always wrong and inconsistent with the dignity and worth of every person."

In 2016, after the death of U.S. Supreme Court Justice Antonin Scalia, Leo raised funds to rename George Mason University's Law School the Antonin Scalia Law School. Leo worked with Senate Majority Leader Mitch McConnell to block President Barack Obama's replacement appointee, Merrick Garland and first contacted Gorsuch about the possibility of President Donald Trump appointing Gorsuch to the seat vacated by Scalia's death.

Leo was heavily involved in the campaign to prevent Merrick Garland from filling the Supreme Court seat previously occupied by Antonin Scalia; the Judicial Crisis Network, linked to Leo, reported that it spent more than $7 million to prevent Garland's confirmation. Leo was connected to two dozen conservative nonprofit entities that raised over $250 million between 2014 and 2017. Donors who contributed to this network included Charles Koch and Rebekah Mercer.

In 2017, legal analyst Jeffrey Toobin wrote that Leo was "responsible, to a considerable extent, for one third of the justices on the Supreme Court."

In 2017, Kris Mauren of the Acton Institute said that Leo has played "a significant leadership role in the selection and successful confirmation of a third of the currently sitting justices on the Supreme Court."

In 2019, The Washington Post wrote of Leo, "few people outside government have more influence over judicial appointments now than Leo." Leo described himself in 2019 as "a leader of the conservative legal movement." Leo has said of Mitch McConnell, who has broken records in seating Republican judicial nominees, that he was "the most consequential majority leader, certainly, in modern history."

In January 2020, Leo announced that he would be leaving his position as vice president at the Federalist Society to start a new group, CRC Advisors. CRC Advisors is a conservative public affairs consulting firm modeled off of the liberal advisory group Arabella Advisors. CRC Advisors has lobbied against climate change mitigation policies. Leo remained in his role as co-chairman of the Federalist Society's board of directors.

In October 2018, Leo appeared on an episode of Firing Line. When asked about a possible vacancy on the Supreme Court in a future election year, he replied by saying: "If a vacancy occurs in 2020, the vacancy needs to remain open until a president is elected and inaugurated and can pick. That's my position, period." Leo said he would advise Trump not to act on an election year Supreme Court vacancy, saying he had never asked Trump about the possible scenario, but that it was Leo's opinion that he should not act on a 2020 Supreme Court vacancy, should it arise.

After the death of Ruth Bader Ginsburg in September 2020, Leo said the impending Supreme Court nomination fight "can be an important galvanizing force for President Trump." In September 2020, The Wall Street Journal reported that Leo was involved in the selection process for a Supreme Court nominee to replace Ginsburg; this ultimately resulted in the appointment of Amy Coney Barrett.

Religious work 
Leo was national co-chairman of Catholic outreach for the Republican National Committee, and as the 2004 Bush presidential campaign's Catholic strategist. He was appointed by President George W. Bush and the United States Senate to three terms on the United States Commission on International Religious Freedom.

He is a board member of the National Catholic Prayer Breakfast.

In 2012, Leo was on the boards of the Catholic Association and its affiliate Catholic Association Foundation. These two organizations ran campaigns opposing the legalization of same-sex marriage. In 2016, Leo received $120,000 for his work for the Catholic Association.

While Leo was the chairman of the United States Commission on International Religious Freedom, a Muslim policy analyst filed a complaint against the group with the Equal Employment Opportunity Commission alleging that she had been the victim of anti-Muslim discrimination. Leo denied the claims of discrimination against the organization, and no specific claims were made regarding Leo. The EEOC complaint was dismissed.

Other appointments and work 
He has been a U.S. delegate to the United Nations Council and UN Commission on Human Rights as well as the Organization for Security and Cooperation in Europe and World Health Assembly. Leo has been an observer at the World Intellectual Property Organization and as a member of the U.S. National Commission to UNESCO.

Leo has been published in The New York Times, The Wall Street Journal, and The Huffington Post. He received the 2009 Bradley Prize.

Leo has been on the board of directors of various organizations such as Reclaim New York, a charity with ties to conservative activists Rebekah Mercer and Steve Bannon; Liberty Central, a charity founded by Virginia Thomas, wife of Clarence Thomas; the Catholic Association and an affiliated charity, the Catholic Association Foundation; The National Catholic Prayer Breakfast; the Becket Law Fund; Students for Life; the Napa Legal Institute; the Youth Leadership Foundation; and the Board of Visitors at The Busch School of Business at Catholic University.

Leo is a member of the Council for National Policy, whose other members include, among others, Virginia Thomas, the wife of Clarence Thomas; Brent Bozell, founder of the Media Research Center; and Ralph Reed, chairman of the nonprofit Faith and Freedom Coalition.

In filings with the Federal Election Commission, Leo listed the BH Group as his employer. In 2018, the Judicial Crisis Network reported paying BH Group $1.2 million in fees. In its first two years of existence, the BH Group received more than $4 million from the Judicial Crisis Network, its sister entity, the Judicial Education Project and a third nonprofit, the Wellspring Committee. Leo is also the president of the Freedom and Opportunity Fund.

Rule of Law Trust 

Leo is the sole trustee of, and only individual associated with, the Rule of Law Trust. Its stated mission is "to advance conservative principles and causes". It reported revenue of more than $80 million in 2018. The Rule of Law Trust has received $153 million from the Marble Freedom Trust in order to push for the appointment of more conservative judges in the courts.

Marble Freedom Trust 

He is the trustee and chairman of the Marble Freedom Trust, founded in 2020. The trust was given $1.6 billion in late 2020 by Illinois businessman Barre Seid. The trust is a 501(c)4 organization which supports conservative political causes. It is allowed to spend up to 50% of its budget on political advocacy, but that spending is taxed by the IRS. The trust, on other spending, is exempt from paying taxes. Leo has primary authority to decide how the trust's money is spent. The Marble Freedom Trust has distributed nearly a quarter of a billion dollars, including $153 million to the Rule of Law Trust to push the appointment of conservative judges.

Conservative network building

An October 2022 article by Kenneth P. Vogel in The New York Times detailed how Leo, previously best known for his role in conservative judicial appointments, had developed a larger coalition on the right. Vogel wrote that Leo had built "one of the best-funded and most sophisticated operations in American politics, giving him extraordinary influence as he pushes a broad array of hot-button conservative causes and seeks to counter what he sees as an increasing leftward tilt in society." Leo's network is made up of various loosely affiliated non-profit and for-profit entities which spent nearly $504 million between mid-2015 and 2021. The network has critiqued "woke capitalism" and has criticized corporations for pushing environmental, social, and corporate governance (E.S.G.) causes. Two for-profit firms Leo at least partly controls, BH Group and CRC Advisors, are compensated by funding hubs in his network, The 85 Fund and the Concord Fund.

Personal life 
Leo is Roman Catholic. He has seven children with his wife, Sally. Their daughter Margaret died in 2007 at the age of 14 from spina bifida. Leo has spoken about the profound impact her life had on him. Leo is a knight of the Sovereign Military Order of Malta, a Catholic lay religious order.

Leo has a summer home in Northeast Harbor, Maine, where he has been the target of periodic protests due to his advocacy for anti-abortion Supreme Court justices. In the weeks following the reversal of Roe v. Wade, protests were held there on an almost daily basis.

Works 
 Presidential Leadership: Rating the Best and the Worst in the White House (Simon & Schuster, 2004), co-editor, . Leo co-edited this volume with James Taranto.

References

External links 
 Federalist Society biography
 

1965 births
Living people
20th-century American lawyers
21st-century American lawyers
American legal writers
American Roman Catholics
Cornell Law School alumni
Cornell University alumni
Knights of Malta
Federalist Society members
Lawyers from Washington, D.C.
People from Northport, New York
Washington, D.C., Republicans